Craig George Pead (born 15 September 1981) is an English former professional footballer who played as a full back in the Football League for Walsall, Coventry City, Brentford and Notts County. He was capped by England at youth level and later became a coach.

Club career

Coventry City 
A midfielder, Pead began his career in the youth system at Premier League club Coventry City in 1997 and signed his first professional contract in September 1998. While a teenager, Pead had an operation on his right knee, which removed 90% of the cartilage and the subsequent problems with the knee were so severe that he contemplated quitting football. After returning to fitness and being moved from left back to his preferred central midfield position, Pead finally made his senior debut when he played the opening 82 minutes of a 1–0 defeat to Burnley on 21 April 2002.

Pead broke into the squad during the 2002–03 season and was a regular inclusion from December 2002 through to the end of the campaign. He made 26 appearances and scored the first senior goal of his career, which came in a 2–2 draw with Preston North End on 5 April 2003. Pead's progress was rewarded with a new two-year contract in March 2003 and he was voted the club's 2002–03 Young Player of the Year. Behind three loan midfielders in the pecking order and suffering with injuries, Pead had "a wasted" 2003–04 season, in which he made only 18 appearances, scoring one goal. A calf injury saw him sit out the opening month of the 2004–05 season and he subsequently spent much of the campaign away on loan. Pead was released in May 2005 and made 45 appearances and scored two goals during seven years as a professional at Highfield Road.

Notts County (loan) 
On 9 September 2004, Pead joined injury-hit League Two club Notts County on a one-month loan. He made six appearances and the loan was extended for a second month, but a lack of funds to retain Pead meant that the loan was terminated before he could make any further appearances.

Walsall (loan and permanent transfer) 
On 23 March 2005, Pead joined League One strugglers Walsall on loan until the end of the 2004–05 season. He was an ever-present starter in the final eight league matches of the season and helped the Saddlers finish comfortably in mid-table. On 27 May 2005, Pead joined Walsall on a permanent basis and signed a two-year contract. He captained the team on occasion during a disastrous 2005–06 season, which ended with relegation to League Two. Pead had an excellent 2006–07 season, making 45 appearances and winning the first silverware of his career when Walsall secured an immediate return to League One by winning the League Two championship. He was voted into the League Two PFA Team of the Year, but despite the accolade, Pead was not offered a new contract by manager Richard Money and was released in June 2007.

Brentford 
On the recommendation of his former Walsall captain Michael Dobson, Pead joined newly relegated League Two club Brentford on a two-year contract on 2 July 2007. Less than three weeks later, he suffered an ankle ligament injury during a pre-season friendly and had to wait until 1 September to make his competitive debut for the Bees, which came in a 2–1 victory over Bury. He was utilised as a central midfielder by manager Terry Butcher, but after Butcher was replaced by Andy Scott in December 2007, Pead was moved to right back, which had come to be his preferred position. Despite making 35 appearances during the 2007–08 season and being voted into the League Two PFA Team of the Year for the second year in succession,

Pead was made available for transfer by manager Andy Scott in May 2008. He failed a medical at Port Vale in May and trialled with Cheltenham Town in July 2008 and remained with Brentford for the 2008–09 season. He began the season as a regular starter, but dropped to the bench in September 2008 and underwent exploratory surgery on his long-standing knee problem late in the year. Pead failed to return to fitness before the end of the season, but despite making just six league appearances, he was awarded a League Two championship medal. Pead was released in May 2009 and elected to retire, due to his long-standing knee problem. During his two seasons with Brentford, he made 44 appearances.

Coventry Sphinx 
Pead came out of retirement to join Midland Alliance club Coventry Sphinx in August 2010. He made just one appearance for the club, in a 4–3 defeat to Friar Lane & Epworth on 10 August.

Redditch United 
Pead joined Conference North club Redditch United in August 2010 and made 12 appearances during the 2010–11 season.

International career 
Pead was capped by England at U18 and U20 level. He was a part of the U20 squad which finished fourth at the 2002 Toulon Tournament.

Coaching career 
On 14 August 2021, Pead joined Southern League Premier Division Central club Banbury United as first team coach.

Personal life 
Pead's father worked as a kit man at Coventry City. Whilst players at Brentford, Pead shared a flat in Feltham with Lee Thorpe. After his retirement from football in 2009, Pead returned to the West Midlands and opened Soccer Rockz, a youth football coaching school. He later worked as Business Development Manager for BPMpro, as a personal trainer and as an FA-registered intermediary.

Career statistics

Honours

Walsall
Football League Two: 2006–07

Brentford

 Football League Two: 2008–09

Individual

 Football League Two PFA Team of the Year: 2006–07, 2007–08
 Coventry City Young Player of the Year: 2002–03
 Coventry City Academy Hall of Fame

Notes

External links

1981 births
Living people
English footballers
Association football fullbacks
Coventry City F.C. players
Notts County F.C. players
Walsall F.C. players
Brentford F.C. players
Redditch United F.C. players
Association football utility players
Sportspeople from Bromsgrove
English Football League players
National League (English football) players
Coventry Sphinx F.C. players
England youth international footballers